Meraj Pourtaghi (born March 18, 1998) is an Iranian football forward who currently plays for Shahr Khodro in the Persian Gulf Pro League.

Club career

Shahr Khodro
He made his debut for Shahr Khodro in the second fixtures of 2020–21 Iran Pro League against Paykan while he substituted in for Rouhollah Seifollahi.

References

External links
 Meraj Pourtaghi at PersianLeague.com
Meraj Pourtaghi on Instagram

Living people
1998 births
Association football forwards
Iranian footballers
Shahr Khodro F.C. players
Damash Gilan players
Esteghlal F.C. players
People from Tonekabon
Sportspeople from Mazandaran province
21st-century Iranian people